Inga Marte Thorkildsen (born 2 July 1976) is a Norwegian politician for the Socialist Left Party (SV). She served as Minister of Children and Equality from 2012 to 2013.

Career

Growing up in Stokke, she was elected to the Norwegian Parliament representing Vestfold in 2001. She served as Minister of Children, Equality and Social Inclusion from 2012 to 2013 when Stoltenberg's cabinet resigned. She lost her seat in the 2013 election.

Thorkildsen went on to serve in the Oslo city council cabinet following the 2015 local election. She first served as commissioner for the elderly, health and labour from 2015 to 2017, before being appointed commissioner for knowledge and education. She resigned her position on 19 October 2021, citing that she wanted to take a break and figure out what she wanted to do next.

She received the Rights Prize (Rettighetsprisen) in 2018 for her work combating domestic violence.

On 15 February 2022, Thorkildsen asked the city council to take leave, stating that she was expecting to leave politics for good.

Parliamentary Committee duties 
2005 – 2009 member of the Standing Committee on Health and Care Services.
2001 – 2005 deputy member of the Electoral Committee.
2001 – 2005 member of the Standing Committee on Justice.

References

External links

1976 births
Living people
People from Stokke
Vestfold politicians
Socialist Left Party (Norway) politicians
Members of the Storting
Women members of the Storting
Ministers of Children, Equality and Social Inclusion of Norway
21st-century Norwegian politicians
21st-century Norwegian women politicians
Women government ministers of Norway